Liu Yuanzhang (January, 1925 – 3 April 2014 ) was an academician of the Chinese Academy of Engineering (CAE), and professor of quality management engineering at Shanghai University.

References 

1925 births
2014 deaths
Engineers from Anhui
Scientists from Anhui
Engineering educators
Members of the Chinese Academy of Engineering
Academic staff of Shanghai University
People from Lu'an
Educators from Anhui
20th-century Chinese engineers